IFK Strömsund is a Swedish football club located in Strömsund.

Background
IFK Strömsund currently plays in Division 4 Jämtland/Härjedalen which is the sixth tier of Swedish football. They play their home matches at the Strömsvallen in Strömsund.

The club is affiliated to Jämtland-Härjedalens Fotbollförbund.

Season to season

In their most successful period IFK Strömsund competed in the following divisions:

In recent seasons IFK Strömsund have competed in the following divisions:

Footnotes

External links
 IFK Strömsund – Official website

Football clubs in Jämtland County
1908 establishments in Sweden
Idrottsföreningen Kamraterna